Frances St. John Smith (1910–1928) was a freshman at Smith College who disappeared in January 1928. 

The search for Smith extended to convents in Quebec, Canada and to Paris, France, where her aunt resided. Paradise Pond, adjacent to the Smith College campus in Northampton, Massachusetts, was drained on March 29, 1928. Ice covering the pond prevented its being drained earlier, but nothing was found.

A year later on March 29, 1929, two men fishing 20 miles away in a small boat on the Connecticut River near Longmeadow, Massachusetts, pulled up a female body.

Based on the female's height (5'5" to 5'6") and bulging forehead, police initially identified the body as Smith, however, the girl's parents discredited the identification of the corpse. A friend from Smith College confirmed that Smith wore a silver retainer to straighten her teeth like the one authorities found in the mouth of the body. The band extended from the eye teeth on the lower jaw. Smith's dentist was able to provide her dental fittings that aligned with the corpse.

The girl's parents never accepted the body as Frances, but did concede to bury the girl's body in Wildwood Cemetery in Amherst, Massachusetts.

References

Smith College people
1910 births
1928 deaths
People from Massachusetts
20th-century American women